{{DISPLAYTITLE:C23H36O2}}
The molecular formula C23H36O2 (molar mass: 344.53 g/mol, exact mass: 344.2715 u) may refer to:

 Cardanolide
 Dimepregnen, or 6α,16α-dimethylpregn-4-en-3β-ol-20-one
 Luteone (terpenoid)